Songchai Thongcham (born 9 June 2001) is a Thai professional footballer who plays as a centre back for Thai League 1 club Chonburi.

Career
Songchai learned to play football in the youth team of Chonburi FC. The club from Chonburi played in the country's highest league, the Thai League 1. It was here that he signed his first professional contract on 1 July 2020. The central defender made his debut in the first division on 20 September 2020 in the away game against PT Prachuap Here he was in the starting line-up and played the full ninety minutes.

Honours
Chonburi
 Thai FA Cup : Runner-up 2020–21

References

External links
 
 

2001 births
Living people
Songchai Thongcham
Songchai Thongcham
Association football defenders
Songchai Thongcham
Songchai Thongcham
Songchai Thongcham
Songchai Thongcham
Songchai Thongcham